ATM (Algérie Télécom Mobile) Mobilis or simply Mobilis (styled mobilis in its logo), a subsidiary of , is the first and one of the three major mobile operators in Algeria. It became independent in August 2003.

History 
On , Mobilis was the first operator in Algeria to be provisionally granted a license to launch 4G network.

In 2017, Mobilis held 40.06% of the country's total mobile telephony market share, with  3G subscriber and no less than  4G subscriber (47.26% and 35.53% market share, respectively).

See also
Algérie Télécom

References

External links

Algerian brands
Companies based in Algiers
Telecommunications companies established in 2003
Internet service providers of Algeria
Telecommunications companies of Algeria
2003 establishments in Algeria